is a Japanese television drama series and the 95th asadora series, following Toto Neechan. It was premiered on October 3, 2016, and ended on April 1, 2017.

Plot
Sumire (Kyoko Yoshine) was born as the second child from a wealthy family. She enjoys embroidery and sewing. Whatever Sumire decides to do, she must achieve the goal no matter what.

During World War II, Sumire gets married and becomes pregnant, but her husband is sent off to war. She gives birth to her first daughter. Right before the end of war, the city of Kobe is attacked. Due to the attack, Sumire loses property. While waiting for her husband to return, she begins to make children's clothes.

Cast
Kyoko Yoshine as Sumire Bando
Katsuhisa Namase as Isoya Bando
Miho Kanno as Hana Bando
Kengo Kora as Kiyoshi Nogami
Misako Renbutsu as Yuri Nogami
Kento Nagayama as Norio Bando
Mitsuki Tanimura as Akemi Ono
Kanako Momota  as Ryoko Ozawa
Kaho Tsuchimura as Kimie Murata
Yūta Hiraoka as Shōichi Murata
Yuki Furukawa as Kentarō Murata
Yōko Ishino as Kotoko Murata
Yuya Matsushita as Eisuke Iwasa
Jun Nagura as Shōzō Nogami
Yōji Tanaka as Katsuji Ozawa
Momiji Yamamura as Setsuko Bando
Masami Horiuchi as Gorou Tanaka
Mana Mikura as Shizuko Bando
Yukari Taki as Etsuko Takanishi
Keiko Miyata as Kiyo Sato
Bundō Soganoya as Chuichiro Iguchi
Charlotte Kate Fox as Amy McGregor
Masachika Ichimura as Shigeo Asada
Tamao Nakamura as Tokuko Bando
Hirotaro Honda as Chotaro Bando
Hiroki Nakajima as Takeshi Adachi
Manami Igashira as Sakura Bando
Yuki Morinaga as Ryuichi Bando
Masato Ibu as Tamotsu Oshima
Yusaku Mori as Naomasa Nakanishi

Production
The theme song of the series is "Hikari no Atelier" by Mr. Children.

References

External links
 Official website 

Asadora
2016 Japanese television series debuts
2017 Japanese television series endings